Metiscus is a genus of skippers in the family Hesperiidae. Species of the genus are found in Central America.

Species
Recognised species in the genus Metiscus include:
 Metiscus angularis  (Möschler, 1877)
 Metiscus atheas Godman, 1900 - Mather's brown-eye 
 Metiscus goth Grishin, 2022

References

Natural History Museum Lepidoptera genus database
Godman, Frederick DuCane.  Biologia Centrali-Americana. Insecta. Lepidoptera-Rhopalocera. London, Dulau & Co., Bernard Quaritch. 1901.

Hesperiidae genera
Taxa named by Frederick DuCane Godman